Waterfront Fountain was an outdoor 1974 fountain and sculpture by James FitzGerald and Margaret Tomkins, installed along Alaskan Way in Seattle, in the U.S. state of Washington. The fountain was located adjacent to the Seattle Aquarium at Waterfront Park on Pier 58.

History 
FitzGerald created several fountains for parks around the Seattle area, including one at the Seattle Center for the Century 21 Exposition in 1962. He was commissioned to design a fountain for the new Waterfront Park, but died in 1973 before work was finalized. The project had been funded by a $75,000 donation from Helen Martha Schiff. Following his death in 1973, his widow Margaret Tomkins lead the effort to complete the fountain's design. It was completed alongside the park in October 1974.

On September 13, 2020, the central portion of Pier 58 collapsed during early demolition work following the discovery of extensive structural issues. The structural integrity of the pier had been compromised by a combination of the environment and the supports for the fountain failing. The fountain, weighing 4 tons, fell into the water along with two contractors who were working on the demolition.

See also

 1974 in art

References

External links
 Waterfront Fountain – Seattle, Washington at Waymarking

1974 establishments in Washington (state)
1974 sculptures
2020 disestablishments in Washington (state)
Destroyed sculptures
Fountains in Washington (state)
Outdoor sculptures in Seattle
Works by James FitzGerald (artist)
Central Waterfront, Seattle